Pityocera is a genus of flies in the family Tabanidae.

Species
Pityocera barrosi Gorayeb & Krolow, 2015
Pityocera cervus (Wiedemann, 1828)
Pityocera ecuadorensis Buestan & Krolow, 2015
Pityocera festae Giglio-Tos, 1896
Pityocera gorayebi Limeira-de-Oliveira & Krolow, 2015
Pityocera nana (Walker, 1850)
Pityocera nigribasis Fairchild, 1964
Pityocera patellicornis Kröber, 1930
Pityocera pernaquila Gorayeb & Krolow, 2015
Pityocera rhinolissa Krolow & Henriques, 2015

References

Tabanidae
Brachycera genera
Diptera of South America
Taxa named by Ermanno Giglio-Tos